

76001–76100 

|-bgcolor=#f2f2f2
| colspan=4 align=center | 
|}

76101–76200 

|-bgcolor=#f2f2f2
| colspan=4 align=center | 
|}

76201–76300 

|-id=272
| 76272 De Jong ||  || Eric De Jong (born 1946) works on the scientific visualization of planetary surfaces and atmospheres and the evolution of planetary systems dynamics at the Jet Propulsion Laboratory. || 
|}

76301–76400 

|-id=309
| 76309 Ronferdie ||  || Ronald Ferdie (1939–2007) worked in the aerospace industry in the early days of the Apollo program at the Marshall Space Flight Center. He served in the executive of a number of amateur astronomy clubs across the U.S., inspiring and encouraging many beginners to the endeavor. || 
|}

76401–76500 

|-bgcolor=#f2f2f2
| colspan=4 align=center | 
|}

76501–76600 

|-bgcolor=#f2f2f2
| colspan=4 align=center | 
|}

76601–76700 

|-id=628
| 76628 Kozí Hrádek || 2000 HC || Kozí Hrádek is a remnant of a 14th-century castle near Tábor, Czech Republic, abandoned since the end of the 15th century. || 
|}

76701–76800 

|-id=713
| 76713 Wudia ||  || Milan Wudia (1963–2007) was an outstanding Czech engineer and a pioneer of automated telescopes. He worked at the Nicolas Copernicus Observatory and Planetarium in Brno, and among his works was a computer control system of the Ondřejov 0.65-m telescope with which this minor planet was discovered. || 
|}

76801–76900 

|-id=818
| 76818 Brianenke ||  || Brian L. Enke (born 1964) is a systems and data analyst, and planetary scientist, at Southwest Research Institute, and also a recognized science-fiction author. He has participated in multiple interplanetary spacecraft missions and in the discovery of several asteroid satellites from imaging. || 
|}

76901–77000 

|-bgcolor=#f2f2f2
| colspan=4 align=center | 
|}

References 

076001-077000